The 2018 Big Sky Conference men's basketball tournament was the postseason men's basketball tournament for the Big Sky Conference. The tournament was held from March 6–10, 2018 at the Reno Events Center in Reno, Nevada. Regular-season champion Montana defeated Eastern Washington in the championship game to win the tournament and receive the conference's automatic bid to the NCAA tournament.

Seeds
Teams were seeded by conference record, with a tiebreaker system used to seed teams with identical conference records. The top four teams received a first round bye.

Schedule

Bracket

* denotes overtime period

NCAA tournament
The Grizzlies received the automatic bid to the NCAA tournament; no other Big Sky members were invited to the tournament or the NIT. Montana was seeded 14th in the West regional and lost by fourteen to Michigan in the first round in Wichita. The last Big Sky team to advance in the NCAA tourney was Montana, a dozen years earlier in 2006.

References

External links

Tournament
Big Sky Conference men's basketball tournament
College basketball tournaments in Nevada
Big Sky Conference men's basketball tournament
Big Sky Conference men's basketball tournament
Basketball competitions in Reno, Nevada
College sports tournaments in Nevada